Senator Liu may refer to:

Carol Liu (born 1940), California State Senate
John Liu (born 1967), New York State Senate